Robert Staunton Naish (born April 23, 1963 in La Jolla, San Diego, California) is an American athlete and entrepreneur who has won 24 World Championship Windsurfing titles.  He is also considered a pioneer of kiteboarding and stand-up paddleboarding (SUP).

In 1976, Naish won his first world championship in windsurfing at age 13 in the Bahamas. Since then, he has been featured in films, videos, news reports, and articles. In 1996, Naish founded Naish Sails Hawaii, which manufactures and sells sailboards, sails, kitesurfing equipment, stand up paddle boards and paddles, hydrofoils, foilboards, and wing-surfers.

Sponsors 
 Red Bull

Awards 
 1976 Windsurf World Champion
 24-times Windsurfing World Champion
 1998 Kiteboarding Slalom World Champion
 1999 Kiteboarding Slalom and Jumping World Champion
 2000 “Lifetime Achievement Award” and “Kiteboarder of the Year” at NEA International Sports Awards Munich, Germany
 2000 “Boarder of the Millennium” at the French Boarder Awards
 2002 PWA Hall of Fame Induction
 2012 “Lifetime Achievement Award” at the Nuit de la Glisse
 2017 National Sailing Hall of Fame 
 2019 Hawaii Waterman Hall of Fame Induction
 Founding Member of the Laureus World Sports Academy
 6-time Surfer of the Year (German SURF Magazine)

References

External links

Naish Naish kites, windsurf and surfboard site
Robby Naish – The Windsurfing Podcast, windsurfing.tv, 16. September 2020
International Windsurfing Association biography
Robby Naish Red Bull

1963 births
Living people
American windsurfers
American kitesurfers
Sportspeople from Hawaii
Male kitesurfers
American sportsmen
Windsurfing
Hydrofoils
Kites
Surfing
Laureus World Sports Awards